Bouabdellah, also sometimes transliterated Bouabdallah is an Arabic surname and given name.

Surname
Notable people with this surname include:
 Madjid Bouabdellah (born 1981), Algerian football player
 Zoulikha Bouabdellah (born 1977), Russian-born Algerian artist

Given name
Notable people with this given name include:
 Bouabdellah Daoud (born 1978), Algerian footballer
 Bouabdellah Tahri (born 1978), Algerian runner